Julien Bernard (born 17 March 1992) is a French cyclist, who currently rides for UCI WorldTeam .

Career
The son of former professional cyclist Jean-François Bernard, Julien Bernard was initially discouraged from taking up cycle racing by his father; he originally played tennis and football as a goalkeeper before switching to cycling at the age of 16. He joined  as a stagiaire in 2015, where he ended up becoming the team's lead rider in the USA Pro Cycling Challenge, where he finished tenth overall. Bernard joined the team full-time in 2016, and he was named in the startlist for that year's Vuelta a España and the start list for the 2017 Giro d'Italia. In July 2018, he was named in the start list for the Tour de France.

Major results
2015
 6th Overall Tour of Hainan
 10th Overall USA Pro Cycling Challenge
2016
 6th Overall Abu Dhabi Tour
1st  Young rider classification
2018
10th Overall Tour Poitou-Charentes en Nouvelle-Aquitaine
2020
 Tour des Alpes-Maritimes et du Var
1st  Mountains classification
1st Stage 3
 1st  Mountains classification Tour de l'Ain
2021
 1st 
 9th Overall Danmark Rundt

Grand Tour general classification results timeline

References

External links
 
 
 

1992 births
Living people
French male cyclists
People from Nevers
Sportspeople from Nièvre
Cyclists from Bourgogne-Franche-Comté